Where Is Kyra? (released in the United Kingdom as Deceit) is a 2017 American drama film directed by Andrew Dosunmu with a screenplay by Darci Picoult and a story by Dosunmu and Picoult. The film stars Michelle Pfeiffer and Kiefer Sutherland.

The film had its world premiere at the Sundance Film Festival on January 23, 2017. It was released in a limited release on April 6, 2018, by Great Point Media and Paladin.

Cast 
 Michelle Pfeiffer as Kyra Johnson
 Kiefer Sutherland as Doug
 Suzanne Shepherd as Ruth Johnson
 Sam Robards as Carl
 Rutanya Alda as Ms. Pavlovsky

Production 
Killer Films' Christine Vachon produced the film along with David Hinojosa and Rhea Scott, while Great Point Media financed the film. Originally titled Beat-Up Little Seagull, later it was re-titled Where Is Kyra?.

Principal photography on the film began on November 2, 2015 in New York City, and it ended on January 2, 2016.

Release
The film premiered at the 2017 Sundance Film Festival on January 23, 2017. In January 2018, it was announced Great Point Media and Paladin would distribute the film. It was released in a limited release on April 6, 2018.
Where is Kyra was released in the UK in March 2019 digitally with a changed title of Deceit.

Critical reception
On Rotten Tomatoes, the film has an approval rating of 81% based on 53 reviews and an average rating of 6.4/10. The website's critical consensus reads, "Where Is Kyra? rests on Michelle Pfeiffer's magnetically raw performance — and lives up to it with a trenchant, hard-hitting story." On Metacritic, the film has an average score of 72 out of 100, based on 20 critics, indicating "generally favorable reviews".
Michelle Pfeiffer was nominated for a 2018 Gotham Award for Best Actress for her performance.

References

External links 
 
 

2017 films
2017 drama films
2017 independent films
American drama films
American independent films
Films directed by Andrew Dosunmu
Films produced by Christine Vachon
Films set in Brooklyn
Films shot in New York City
Killer Films films
2010s English-language films
2010s American films